is a passenger railway station located in the city of Ōtsu, Shiga Prefecture, Japan, operated by the private railway company Keihan Electric Railway.

Lines

Station layout
The station consists of two bay platforms serving three tracks.

Platforms

Adjacent stations

History
It was renamed to its present name on August 20, 1937. On October 1, 1950, it was renamed , but reverted to Ishiyamadera Station on April 1, 1953.

Passenger statistics
In fiscal 2018, the station was used by an average of 1236 passengers daily (boarding passengers only).

Surrounding area
 Ishiyama-dera
 Ishiyama Onsen
 Shiga Prefectural Ishiyama High School

See also
List of railway stations in Japan

References

External links

Keihan official home page

Railway stations in Shiga Prefecture
Stations of Keihan Electric Railway
Railway stations in Japan opened in 1927
Railway stations in Ōtsu